Pirates of the Caribbean is a 2003 action role-playing video game for Microsoft Windows and Xbox, developed by Akella and published by Bethesda Softworks. The game was initially developed as a sequel to Sea Dogs (Корсары), but was eventually changed to correspond to the Pirates of the Caribbean movie. It was still marketed as Sea Dogs 2 in Russia.

The Xbox version was the first U.S. console game developed in Russia. An unrelated game by the same name was also released for mobile phones, as was a Game Boy Advance game.

PC/Xbox version
Pirates of the Caribbean is an action role-playing game in which the player, as Captain Nathaniel Hawk, goes on a series of quests for any one of the countries that control the islands of the Caribbean in the 17th century. The player can buy new ships, recruit a crew and hire officers who will follow Hawk on his quest and help him in battle. The game features gameplay that takes place both on land and at sea, and allows the player to upgrade their character by earning skill points and gain new abilities.

The game was originally developed under the name Sea Dogs II, and is an indirect sequel to Sea Dogs, which was released in 2000. In Akella's native Russia, the game is still referred to as Corsairs II: The Pirates of the Caribbean (Корсары II: Пираты Карибского моря), with Corsairs (Корсары) being the Russian title for Sea Dogs. It has since been reissued in Russia as simply Pirates of the Caribbean (Пираты Карибского моря).

Apart from the pirate theme, the setting and the presence of the Black Pearl, the game otherwise has few connections to the Pirates of the Caribbean: The Curse of the Black Pearl film, which was released around the same time as the game.

The PC version of this game is one of the first video games with multi-threaded code that is optimized for the Intel's Hyper-Threading technology.

Actress Keira Knightley, who played Elizabeth Swann in the film series, voiced the narrator (only two simple cutscenes at the beginning and at the end) in the game.

Plot
After a fierce storm, Captain Nathaniel Hawk arrives on the island of Oxbay. His first mate Malcolm Hatcher is retiring, and so Hawk must hire a new first mate and crew. As he leaves Oxbay, a French armada attacks the colony and captures it. Hawk manages to slip away and warn the English governor on Redmond Island, Robert Christopher Silehard, that Oxbay was attacked.

The governor sends Hawk on a series of quests to aid him in the war against France: Nathaniel is sent to investigate the condition in Oxbay; prevent a supply ship from reaching Oxbay; unload English troops in the jungles of Oxbay and rescue the English spy from the clutches of the French.

While preparing for his next quest - annexing Oxbay, Nathaniel meets his old friends: Danielle Greene and Ralph Fawn. However, Ralph is killed when the soldiers arrive to arrest Danielle and Nathaniel himself is captured and imprisoned. While in prison he gets to know an old ex-cannoneer Edgar Attwood who was fired for drinking too much rum. He can be later hired by the player into his crew.

Some time later governor Silehard arrives and tells Nathaniel that a big mistake has occurred. He sends Nathaniel Hawk on another series of quests until Nathaniel meets an old inventor who aids him in finding a treasure that could defeat the ghost ship called the Black Pearl.

There are also a large number of side quests. For instance, in one such side mission Hawk is enlisted to help a Dutch colonist find several kidnapped children.

The Black Pearl
The Black Pearl is in this game but it is unknown if Barbossa is the captain (although Barbossa is set as the ship's default captain in the game codes). It cannot be destroyed. At night you see the Black Pearl's crew as skeletons. It can only be seen during the middle of the game and the end of the game—however, some people have reported seeing it at random points in the game.

The ship can be found randomly around the world, normally mostly near towns. There will also be warnings in town if the Black Pearl is sighted nearby.

In the final end game mission, Captain Hawk is confronted by the Black Pearl. Only during this fight can the Black Pearl be damaged. When the fight ends, the game is complete.

Reception

Pirates of the Caribbean received "mixed or average reviews" on both platforms according to video game review aggregator Metacritic. The Armchair Empire gave a game 7.7 out of 10 praising its visuals and gameplay but cautions about slow naval battles.

Game Boy Advance version

Mobile phone version
The mobile phone version was developed by Flying Tiger Development and published through Walt Disney Internet Group on July 25, 2003, in the United States.

References

External links

2003 video games
Adventure games
Akella games
Bethesda Softworks games
Disney video games
Flying Tiger Entertainment games
Game Boy Advance games
Mobile games
Naval video games
Open-world video games
Pirates of the Caribbean video games
Role-playing video games
Single-player video games
Trade simulation games
Ubisoft games
Video games developed in Russia
Video games set in the 17th century
Video games set in the Caribbean
Windows games
Xbox games